Stephen Lynn Bridges (May 22, 1963 – March 3, 2012) was an American comedian, impressionist, and actor who was known for his impressions of politicians, television characters and broadcasters including Bill Clinton, George W. Bush, Barack Obama, Arnold Schwarzenegger, Barney Fife, Homer Simpson, Tom Brokaw, Paul Harvey, and Rush Limbaugh.

Early life
Bridges graduated from Biola University in 1986.

Career
His accurate portrayal of Bush led to Bridges being cast as the president in episodes of both JAG and its spin-off, NCIS.

In 2006, he appeared alongside President George W. Bush at the White House Correspondents' Association dinner, mimicking the president by voicing the president's "inner thoughts" during Bush's presidential speech.

Death
On March 3, 2012, Bridges was found dead by his maid in his Los Angeles home after he failed to return a call the day before. According to his agent, Bridges had just returned from performing in Hong Kong and went to bed complaining that he felt "super-jetlagged". His death was ruled an accident, with the probable cause "upper airway anaphylaxis" from a severe allergic reaction.

Filmography
 Nurses (1994) as Torrance
 The District (2000)
 ER (2001) as Leone
 Lange Flate Ballær 2 (2008) as General of the U.S. Navy

As George W. Bush
 JAG episode "Dangerous Game" (2002)
 The Nick Cannon Show episode "Nick Takes Over a Wedding" (2002)
 NCIS episode "Yankee White" (2003)
 Whoopi episode "The Vast Right Wing Conspiracy" (2003)
 George Lopez  (2003)
 Comedy Central Roast of Jeff Foxworthy (2005)
 Merry F#%$in' Christmas (2005)
 The Tonight Show with Jay Leno
 White House Correspondents Dinner (2006)
 Blue Collar Comedy Tour: One For the Road ("Yankee Doody Dandy" segment)
 The View (May 29, 2006)
 Larry King Live (2006)
 Lange Flate Ballær II (2008) (Norwegian movie)
 I Love the New Millennium (2008)

References

External links

Comedy Central Bio

Steve Bridges Profile Page - Video clip, speaking topics
"George W. Bush impersonator Steve Bridges dies at 48"

1963 births
2012 deaths
American male film actors
American male comedians
Comedians from Texas
American impressionists (entertainers)
Biola University alumni
Male actors from Dallas
Respiratory disease deaths in California
Deaths from anaphylaxis
21st-century American comedians
Comedians from Los Angeles County